The Forbes Arena is a 6,000-seat multi-purpose arena in Atlanta, Georgia, USA. It is home to the Morehouse College  Maroon Tigers basketball team. It also hosted basketball preliminary matches during the 1996 Summer Olympics and was the home arena to the Atlanta Glory. It was opened in 1996 at a cost of $8 million. It sits adjacent to the college's old gym, Archer Hall, which seats 1,000.

The arena was named after Franklin L. Forbes, an athletic director at Morehouse College and the school's first basketball coach.

References
1996 Summer Olympics official report. Volume 1. p. 542.
1996 Summer Olympics official report. Volume 3. p. 451.

Notes

Venues of the 1996 Summer Olympics
Sports venues in Atlanta
Indoor arenas in Georgia (U.S. state)
College basketball venues in the United States
Morehouse College
Olympic basketball venues
Sports venues completed in 1996